John Black is a fictional character from Days of Our Lives, an American soap opera on the NBC network. He has been played by actor Drake Hogestyn since 1986, with a break in between from January 2009 to September 2011. John was created by script writers Sheri Anderson, Thom Racina and Leah Laiman as The Pawn in 1985 and introduced by executive producers Betty Corday and Al Rabin. John becomes one of the series' most popular characters when he is revealed to be the presumed dead Roman Brady (Wayne Northrop) with plastic surgery and amnesia. However, Northrop's return in 1991 led to Hogestyn's Roman being retconned into the entirely separate character of John Black, which also establishes the supercouple pairing of John and Marlena, due to John's affair with Roman's wife, Marlena Evans (Deidre Hall). Hogestyn was attributed with helping the series out of its ratings slump in the 1980s. He was often featured in soap opera magazines, such as Soap Opera Digest and Soap Opera Weekly.

Storylines

1986–2009
John Black was modeled after Robert Ludlum's super-spy, Jason Bourne,
with some elements of Ian Fleming's James Bond and of renowned martial arts exponent Bruce Lee, as John Black is a practitioner of the art of Jeet Kune Do along with that of fellow martial arts actor Sonny Chiba. Accordingly, the character has spent a good portion of his tenure on the show as an undercover agent for the International Security Alliance (ISA), the show's fictional secret intelligence service. Days introduced audiences to the character, "John Black", as a heavily bandaged amnesiac who was recovering from extensive facial reconstructive surgery (similar to Lee's character in his last film, Game of Death) & was a former mercenary for hire similar to Sonny Chiba’s character Takuma Tsurugi from The Street Fighter. Initially known only as "The Pawn", a mystery man connected with Victor Kiriakis, Stefano DiMera, and Roman Brady, he soon named himself "John Black" after a name he read on a war memorial, and met Dr. Marlena Evans. Almost immediately, John and Marlena established a rapport. After a while, Marlena began to wonder about John Black's "true" identity. The pair came to believe that John was really Marlena's husband Roman, who had been presumed dead. They resumed their lives as a happily married couple and parents. John Black, now Roman Brady, rejoined the Salem PD, and due to his sleuthing prowess, received a promotion to Commander. The couple's happiness was fleeting as Marlena was kidnapped by Roman's old enemy Orpheus, and purportedly died.

"Roman" moved on, eventually getting engaged to Isabella Toscano. Around the same time, though, Marlena reappeared in Salem alive, and was reunited with "Roman". That same year, Wayne Northrop was recast as Roman Brady and the character that Hogestyn had been portraying for five years was retconned to be a soldier of Stefano DiMera who was brainwashed into believing he was Roman for two purposes - to use his "Roman" imposter to infiltrate the ISA for clues to the whereabouts of a priceless ancient Mayan treasure, but more importantly, to cause havoc within the Brady family with whom the DiMeras had a longstanding feud. Still lacking memories, the character returned to the "John Black" name that he first used. Marlena reunited with the real Roman, and John resumed his relationship with Isabella.

John then discovered that he was Forrest Alamain, brother to the evil Lawrence Alamain. Stefano had brainwashed Forrest into believing he was Roman as part of Stefano's vendetta against the Brady family. During this time, John received help from Victor Kiriakis in figuring out his identity, determining his birthright within the Alamain family, and ultimately setting up his own business. In 1992, John married Isabella, who later gave birth to their son, Brady Victor Black. Sadly, Isabella died of cancer soon after.

Distraught over the death of Isabella, John's feelings for Marlena resurfaced during "The Pit" storyline. Though the two tried to ignore them, John and Marlena gave into their feelings, embarking on a passionate affair. However, Marlena's Daughter, Sami Brady,stumbled upon the affair and resented John and Marlena for hurting her father. This affair resulted in the birth of their daughter, Belle. Initially, Roman was believed to be Belle's father, but the truth came out, and Marlena and Roman divorced. Knowing that their affair had hurt so many people, John pursued other relationships – most significantly with Kristen Blake, who turned out to be Stefano's adopted daughter. Kristen later found out she was pregnant. John and Kristen were engaged, but when Kristen miscarries, she fears losing John to Marlena. Kristen has a pregnant look-alike, Susan Banks, stand in and marry John in her place, with a plan to take Susan's child and raise it as hers and John's. After Kristen's schemes were exposed, John broke up with her and reunited with Marlena.

John and Marlena eventually married in 1999, but on their honeymoon, John disappeared and was brainwashed by Stefano into sleeping with Hope Williams Brady. Hope found out soon after that she was pregnant, and John was believed to be baby Zack's father, until it was proven the father was Hope's husband, Bo. When a serial killer called the "Salem Stalker" began to murder Salem's most prominent citizens, evidence suggested that Marlena was the stalker. She was caught and sent to prison, but John worked to prove that Marlena had been set up. Marlena ended up shot by the police while trying to escape, and died in John's arms. John eventually uncovered that the Salem Stalker debacle was another diabolical DiMera plot; Marlena and her "victims" were found alive on a remote island, "Melaswen" (New Salem spelled backwards). John was seriously injured during his failed rescue attempt. Addicted to painkillers, John sought solace in the all-too-welcoming arms of—and proposed to—Roman's widow Kate Roberts. John and Kate eventually broke off their engagement when Roman and Marlena managed to escape Melaswen and reappeared in Salem. When Marlena became an amnesiac, the specialist summoned to help her – Dr. Alex North – turned out to be her first husband, presumed dead, making Marlena's marriage to John invalid. Marlena rejected John's love, feeling obligated to Alex. Nevertheless, John discovered that Alex was a fraud who had plotted to marry, then kill Marlena. He was able to save Marlena, who eventually got her memory back.

John and Marlena's subsequent reunion was cut short when a dying Stefano reignited his vendetta with John, by compelling his son, EJ DiMera to shoot John. John eventually came out of his coma in May 2007, but was then hit by a car, dying in Marlena's arms on October 17, 2007. However, in January 2008, John was discovered alive in Stefano's basement, with his memory wiped and programmed into a super soldier. Marlena found him, but he was not able to remember her, and continuously committed crimes ordered by Stefano. Stefano ordered him to kill Colleen Brady, but John found out that he was Colleen's son with Santo DiMera, Ryan Brady, making him Stefano's half-brother. He went after the DiMera empire and Stefano after discovering his identity.

Frustrated in her inability to reach the old John, Marlena filed for divorce. John tried to recommit himself to Marlena and remembering their life together. He sought the help of a therapist, Dr. Charlotte Taylor, but she purposely kept John in the dark about his returning memories. With Brady's help, John and Marlena discovered Charlotte's duplicity. Charlotte tried to kill Marlena, and ended up drugging John instead. He woke up with his memories restored. He was paralyzed, but doctors said he could be cured at a clinic in Switzerland. John asked Marlena to marry him again before they leave, and she happily accepted. John and Marlena remarried in the hospital, and left Salem on January 23, 2009.

2011-2015
After a two-year hiatus, John and Marlena returned to Salem on September 26, 2011, for the dedication of the new Horton Town Square. During their visit, the couple announced that John's physical therapy was a success, and he is now able to walk again. Their shared joy was short-lived, however, when the FBI and the Salem PD order Rafe Hernandez to arrest John for embezzling from his company, Basic Black. To protect his family from danger, John pleaded guilty and was sent to prison for 25 years-to-life without parole. In the following days, Rafe and Carrie Brady were able to prove the evidence against John was doctored, and he was exonerated. Hope and Bo found out that while brainwashed by Stefano, Hope and John had been married, making their respective marriages to Bo and Marlena invalid. John and Hope set out for Alamania to get a divorce. Viewers, along with the hapless couple, were forced to revisit two "Days" storylines: "The Pawn", and "Princess Gina".

In December 2012, during a conversation between Hope and Marlena, "Days" viewers learned that John and Hope's divorce was now finalized. By then, Kristen had returned to Salem. Kristen insisted that she had changed her evil ways after therapy. John is willing to believe Kristen while Marlena is suspicious, quickly becoming frustrated with John's optimism. In the intervening weeks, Marlena continued to insist that Kristen had not changed, but John suggests to Marlena that she is obsessed with Kristen. However, when Kristen starts dating Brady, John is determined to get Kristen away from his son. He even goes as far as trying to seduce Kristen and push Marlena away to make this happen. Kristen decides to not get revenge and accept Brady's love, but when Brady discovers her scheming, he breaks up with her. Marlena, meanwhile, finds out about John's scheming, and they separate, hurt and angry with each other. John leaves town on an ISA mission, and he and Marlena file for divorce.

In January 2014, John discovered that he is not the son of Colleen Brady and Santo DiMera, because the real Ryan Brady had died. Hence, John's origins are once more in doubt. In 2014, John returned to Salem, concerned about Brady's drug use and relationship with Theresa Donovan. After Theresa brags about eloping with a drunk Brady in Las Vegas, John records her confession, insuring that Brady dumped her. Theresa panics, and hits John over the head, sending him into a coma. He eventually wakes up, and finds out Kristen is back in town. When he learns Theresa lied and claimed Brady attacked John, he also confirms the lie so Brady won't get back together with Kristen. Brady finds out, though, and denounces his father. John leaves town to take care of Basic Black business in Europe, hoping to give Brady space. He later returns to Salem to work on salvaging his relationship with Marlena and Brady. In early 2015, Police Commissioner Abe Carver asks John to rejoin the Salem Police Department. With Marlena's counsel and blessing, John takes the job despite a not-so-veiled threat from Stefano.

More drama began to crop up for John in March 2015, when Salem newcomer Paul Narita is revealed to be John's biological son, the result of a relationship with Paul's mother Tori. As John and Paul had a falling-out just before the revelation, John is pursuing mending fences with Paul, and establishing a true father-son relationship.

In August 2015, John was approached once again by the ISA to rejoin the agency's ranks. His consideration of the job offer causes friction between him and Marlena, and recent conversations between the two revealed that although the pair remain very much in love, they were still separated and living apart at the time. John later revealed that the motivation for rejoining the ISA was to take advantage of its resources to find his parents and decode the mystery of his past, once and for all, for the sake of his children and grandchildren.

2016-
John finally learned the truth behind his murky past in early 2016, 30 years after arriving in Salem with no memory of it. He was born John Robicheaux in 1953 in rural Louisiana, the son of Timothy and Maude Robicheaux. Timothy was a kind, charitable, and modest farmer who had been drafted into the U.S. Army to serve in the Korean War, and was believed to have died heroically in battle a couple of months before John's birth. Unable to care for John on her own, Maude first allowed a wealthy neighboring couple to adopt him, but when the couple was killed in an automobile accident, she put John in an orphanage, where he was eventually adopted by the wealthy and powerful Leopold and Philomena Alamain, taken to their home in Europe, and given the name Forrest Alamain.

However, Timothy Robicheaux (Tobin Bell) had not really died in the war. Wounded and disillusioned by his combat experiences and the political environment of the war itself, he deserted the Army and fled to neighboring China, where he resolved to start a new life. He steeped himself in the martial arts, Eastern philosophy, and Communist revolutionary ideology, and adopted a new identity, Yo Ling, a Chinese term for "Phantom". Yo Ling's views became ever more radical, and he helped establish an organization of professional spies and assassins, called the "Phantom Alliance", whose ultimate goal was to destabilize the West and bring about worldwide revolution. Among Yo Ling's confederates in the Alliance was a Soviet agent named Ilya Petrov.

The Alliance grew in power and influence, and established a clandestine training center in the United States, using a New England private school called Winterthorne Academy as a cover. Yo Ling eventually learned what happened to his son. He and Petrov located John with the Alamain family, and using some of the Alliance's funds, paid the family a hefty sum for custody of John, with the promise of a fine life and prestigious education in the U.S. (and possible threats if they refused to comply). The family faked "Forrest Alamain's" death with a swimming "accident", and Yo Ling and Petrov took him to Winterthorne to be indoctrinated, brainwashed, trained as a top assassin, and groomed for a role in the upper echelon of the Alliance.

Unfortunately, the corrupt Petrov had formed a business relationship with the notorious international criminal Stefano DiMera, and provided him with the ultimate "soldier" in John (although never overtly stated, it stands to reason that Petrov may have been introduced to Stefano via the latter's common-law marriage to Philomena Alamain's sister Daphne). Although unclear whether this was a betrayal of the Phantom Alliance on Petrov's part, or part of a Yo Ling-DiMera arrangement, Petrov was separated from the Alliance for a period and worked full-time for Stefano. Petrov taught Stefano how to "program" John using the Alliance's brainwashing methods (which were later "enhanced" by techniques developed by Stefano's mad scientist henchman, Dr. Wilhelm Rolf), creating DiMera's long-sought-after "super-soldier".

John eventually became Stefano's "pawn", and was involved in a myriad of schemes and operations on DiMera's behalf. In 1986, Stefano (through Petrov) staked his "pawn" as a wager in a high-stakes yacht race in Miami with the ruthless Salem business tycoon and underworld figure Victor Kiriakis and the equally corrupt ISA Director George Nickerson. The stakes were a "Purse" (staked by Victor – a treasure that he didn't actually yet possess - an ancient priceless Mayan treasure whose location wouldn't be revealed until a specific astronomical event in 1991 - and so "securitized" with revenues from his drug trafficking operations), the "Power" (staked by Nickerson – a book of ISA codes, vaguely related among other things to the Soviet invasion of Afghanistan, which purportedly provided the bearer virtual invulnerability from the worldwide law-enforcement and intelligence communities), and the "Pawn" (staked by Petrov, who was operating on behalf of the believed-dead Stefano at the time). Victor won the wager (and thus, custody of John), and brought him back home to Salem.

Petrov and Nickerson had dropped a number of hints to Victor and other Salemites that John might be the presumed-dead Roman Brady, a police captain and former ISA agent of high value due to his abilities and knowledge of various highly classified subjects (and who was actually being held captive by Stefano at the time). Indeed, using the brainwashing techniques learned from Petrov and Rolf, Stefano had implanted enough facts from Roman's life into John's subconscious that he was able to convince everyone, including John himself, that he was in fact Roman Brady, for a period of over five years. Stefano did this for a couple of reasons - to use his "Roman" imposter to infiltrate the ISA for clues to the location of the aforementioned Mayan treasure, but more importantly to cause havoc within Roman's family, against whom it was later revealed Stefano's father had a longstanding vendetta.

John eventually located the dying Yo Ling, who held John and fellow Phantom Alliance acolyte Eduardo Hernandez captive for a time. Ling was later killed during the men's rescue of John's son Paul Narita.

(This yet-again-retconned explanation of John's history never fully explained how he was temporarily mistaken for the deceased Ryan Brady, as it was suggested that the orphanage in which Maude Robicheaux placed him was in their native Louisiana, a long way from the South American orphanage where it was stated years before that Colleen Brady had hidden baby Ryan, and from where the Alamains allegedly adopted him. Another unanswered question is how long Victor Kiriakis—initially responsible for bringing John to Salem—knew that John wasn't really Roman Brady, as he possessed a thick "John Black file" that contained various clues to the location of the aforementioned Mayan codices, as well as John's identity, during the time of the real Roman's return in 1991; Victor also expressed genuine surprise upon seeing the real Roman return to Salem that same year, and claimed to believe that Roman was actually dead.)

As his past was slowly being revealed, John was also dismissed from the ISA (due to refusing long-term assignments), and he opened a private investigation firm with Steve Johnson called Black Patch. In late 2016 and early 2017, as Drake Hogestyn was recovering from injuries he sustained in an on-set accident, John's absence was explained at first with a visit to his native Louisiana, then by a long-term "assignment" or "mission", suggesting that John was either working for a high-level client of Black Patch, or had been reinstated in the ISA. Hogestyn's return to the show in mid-2017 was explained as the latter being true, as John returned from a deep-cover ISA assignment only to join his wife Marlena on a rescue mission to save several younger Salemites, including his son Paul, from a deserted island. John's adventures in 2017 included helping Paul solve the mystery of Deimos Kiriakis's murder, and yet another classic soap opera mistaken-identity caper

In 2018, John became embroiled in yet another mystery, this time involving his own strange and out-of-character behavior in poisoning his friend Steve, and violent confrontations with his son Paul and step-grandson Will Horton. This has been ordered directly by Pamela Van Damme, the Director of the ISA, under implied threats to John's family. As it turns out, Pamela had risked significant criminal and political exposure by claiming that Ava Vitali's murder was an ISA-ordered hit under "national security" auspices, and wanted revenge against Steve and his family for allowing Joey to take the blame, and jeopardizing Pamela's career (and freedom). John was being blackmailed into poisoning Steve, but was in reality trying to buy time until he could procure an antidote. The antidote worked, and the friends and business partners reconciled, but with lasting damage to Steve's eyesight, for which John still blames himself.

Development

Creation and casting

On January 24, 1986, daytime newcomer and former minor league baseball player, Drake Hogestyn joined the cast as The Pawn without his bandages, who would later assume the alias John Black. As The Pawn (Glen Vincent, then Robert Poynton) was introduced onscreen in November 1985, the casting department at Days of Our Lives had been searching for an older actor to portray The Pawn when Hogestyn wandered into the NBC casting offices to meet with Doris Sabbagh, the head of the casting department at Columbia Pictures about a guest spot on Crazy Like a Fox. Instead, Sabbagh brought Hogestyn in to audition for Days. Hogestyn later admitted that he didn't know anything about the role and he thought he had auditioned for ABC's One Life to Live. Hogestyn was a fan of daytime soaps and his agent had passed on several soap roles "but Drake wanted this one." He watched some episodes and then went to the audition. Though everyone seemed to love him, Hogestyn almost missed out on the role because he was so young. However, it was his screen test with Deidre Hall that put Hogestyn over the top. Hogestyn was chosen out of five other actors and signed a three-year contract.

Retcon (1991)
By the time John is revealed to be Roman in May 1986, Drake Hogestyn had grown quite attached to the character of John. He said "One of the things I'm concerned about now is that it's going to be sad to put John Black to bed. I've had a lot of fun and it's been a stretch for me as an actor." He continued, "I had a chance to be very creative and take chances." Then Hogestyn was suddenly forced to take the character in another direction to see how viewers would react. "But I don't think they'll totally close the door on John Black" Hogestyn suspected. A year later, though he was happy with Roman, Hogestyn said he initially wanted to find success in his own role instead of a recast. The actor later admitted that he never thought of himself as a recast "because I played five months as John Black before they told me I was Roman." During an interview in 1990, Hogestyn said he hoped Wayne Northrop – the original Roman – could someday return as Roman. "Then you could start a whole new character out of that complication."

In the summer of 1991, it was reported that Northrop and Deidre Hall were in talks to return to the series and reprise their respective roles as Roman and Marlena, leaving many to wonder what would become of Hogestyn's Roman. It was later revealed that Hogestyn's Roman was actually John Black all along, and Northrop was the "real" Roman. Hogestyn attributed the plot twist to the "producers' own brilliance" despite him suggesting the storyline a year earlier. He also appreciated the decision from a business perspective. When asked about the possibility of being Roman again if/when Northrop inevitably vacated the role—as the return was expected to be short term—Hogestyn said "I think I'd like to stay John Black because I've already been Roman and I wasn't him." Supervising executive producer Al Rabin said "This is a story that we've wanted to tell for a long time." In fact, there were elements of the story and hints that John may not actually be Roman during the "Stefano Returns" storyline in 1988. Rabin promised that the plot would not affect Hogestyn's future with Days who at the time was locked into a four-year contract.

The producer also shot down speculation that the story would take a page from the prime time soap Dallas in which Patrick Duffy's Bobby Ewing was killed off in season 8 and revealed to be alive in season 10 discounting all of season 9 as a dream. To avoid confusion during production, the two men were referenced in the script by number—Hogestyn being Roman II (John). Over the course of six months, the story explores all avenues most significantly, the effects on Roman and Marlena's twins Eric and Samantha who had been raised by Roman II for most of their lives. In 2002 Hogestyn commented on the retcon: "This is daytime television, and you never know where the story is going to take you."

Such a development would be unique to Days of Our Lives. And exactly 20 years later, One Life to Live would do the same thing with Trevor St. John's very popular portrayal of Todd Manning—a role that was originated by Roger Howarth who was equally as popular—if not more popular. Ironically, a theory about the Days plot where Roman II turned out to be Roman I's long lost twin brother actually factored into the One Life to Live story in 2011.

Relationships

Hogestyn always hoped his character would be paired with Marlena Evans (Deidre Hall) – even when his character's identity is in question. Even viewers began to echo his sentiments—no matter who John Black turned out to be, he and Marlena were meant to be. When Deidre Hall left the series in 1987 and Marlena is killed off, it took quite some for the producers to pair John with another woman. "I get the impression they're trying to keep a low profile because of Deidre's departure." Hogestyn was warned that he wouldn't be getting much story. "I was told I was going to be virtually non-existent" at least until Roman could grieve properly. Though it was difficult wait, Hogestyn understood why the writers chose to put his character in the background. "You can't rush from one love story right into the next" he said. Soap Opera Stars magazine later reported that the show runners weren't sure if Hogestyn would work without Hall and there were plans to write his character out. "Roman's big goodbye scene was nearly in the works." However, after losing several high-profile stars after including Hall, and Peter Reckell and Kristian Alfonso as supercouple Bo and Hope, the network knew they couldn't afford to lose Hogestyn as well. Hogestyn viewed John and Marlena's relationship as a "classic love." It is "the perfect relationship" he said. Hogestyn appreciated that the relationship showed viewers that such a love is possible. When asked about a recast of Marlena instead of a new love interest, Hogestyn admitted that he didn't think viewers would accept it.

Finally trusting that Hogestyn was popular enough to hold his own, the writers introduced a new love interest for him. John/Roman was next paired with Diana Colville played by General Hospital superstar, Genie Francis. Hogestyn revealed that the writers had given the duo much more creative input to establish a more fun dynamic. There weren't any plans to pair Roman/John with Diana but their interactions helped the story write itself. The character of Diana also had a romance with Mike Horton (Michael T. Weiss) and a failed engagement to Victor Kiriakis (John Aniston) and was even considered as a love interest for the returning Bo Brady (Reckell). However, Hogestyn's chemistry with Francis "just couldn't be denied." It is actually John who kidnaps Diana before she marries Victor. While there was initial backlash from staunch Marlena fans fearing John and Diana had developed too soon, majority of viewers quickly became fans of the new pairing not long after their first few scenes together. The duo had really strong scenes from the very beginning. "That was an accident" Hogestyn said. Despite it being seeming too soon, the network ordered the producers to capitalize on the fan reaction. "Genie and I worked hard from day one to make Diana and Roman work" Hogestyn explained. The duo also injected humor into their scenes whenever they could. "That added a nice, little touch to our romance." John/Roman initially tries to keep Diana at arm's length because he fears getting so close to another woman, the way he got with Marlena. However, Diana's near death experience is a "turning point in their relationship." Diana and John/Roman are recognized as a supercouple in their own right. When Francis leaves the series in 1989, Hogestyn finds himself on the back burner once again.

The character was next paired with Yvette DuPrés (Lori Hallier) who is also involved with his rival, Victor Kiriakis. John/Roman keeps Yvette "at arm's length." However Hogestyn considered the romance to be a "relationship of convenience." It provides the opportunity for John/Roman to stick it to Victor "and at the same time have some fun." However, insisted that the romance could never live up to his previous two pairings. Hogestyn was surprised by the abrupt ending of John/Roman's romance with Yvette. He really enjoyed working opposite Lori Hallier. "She was very conscientious about wanting to work... working scenes out. That was so refreshing for me." John's short lived romance with Yvette seems to be a precursor to his next great love story. In early 1990, Hogestyn was informed that his character's next great love story was in the works. John/Roman was next paired with Isabella Toscano (Staci Greason) – the illegitimate daughter of Victor Kiriakis. Hogestyn enjoyed working opposite the newcomer. "She reminds me of me when I first started on the show... I had no soap opera experience, and my energy was boundless."

References

Citations

Notes

External links
John Black profile – NBC.com
John Black profile – Soaps.com
John Black profile – SoapCentral.com

Days of Our Lives characters
Fictional mercenaries
Fictional businesspeople
Fictional business executives
Fictional secret agents and spies
Fictional Jeet Kune Do practitioners
Fictional private investigators
Male characters in television
Fictional characters with amnesia
Fictional characters incorrectly presumed dead

fi:Luettelo televisiosarjan Päivien viemää henkilöistä#John Black